Alexander Evseevich Khinshtein (born 26 October 1974, Moscow, Russian SFSR, USSR) is a Soviet and Russian journalist and politician. He is a deputy from the Samara constituency of the State Duma of the Russian Federal Assembly. He was a member of the 4th, 5th, 6th and 7th State Dumas. He is currently a member of the 8th State Duma. Deputy Secretary of the General Council of United Russia since 23 November 2019, Chairman of the Committee of the State Duma of the Federal Assembly of the Russian Federation on Information Policy, Information Technologies and Communications since 22 January 2020. He is one of the architects of anti-LGBT legislation that bans "promoting LGBT propaganda", saying, "LGBT today is an element of hybrid warfare and in this hybrid warfare we must protect our values, our society and our children,"

Personal life
Khinshtein was born in Russia to Jewish family. His father Yevsey Abramovich Khinshtein and mother Inna Abramovna Regirer are engineers.

Honours and awards
 Order of Honour
 Medal 2nd class of the Order of Merit for the Fatherland
 Medal Defender of a Free Russia
 Medal of Zhukov
 Jubilee Medal "300 Years of the Russian Navy"
 Medal "In Commemoration of the 300th Anniversary of Saint Petersburg"
 Medal "In Commemoration of the 800th Anniversary of Moscow"

Notes and references

External links 

Under the cover of darkness (1998 article)

1974 births
Living people
Politicians from Moscow
United Russia politicians
Journalists from Moscow
Moscow State University alumni
People from Samara Oblast
Fourth convocation members of the State Duma (Russian Federation)
Fifth convocation members of the State Duma (Russian Federation)
Sixth convocation members of the State Duma (Russian Federation)
Seventh convocation members of the State Duma (Russian Federation)
Eighth convocation members of the State Duma (Russian Federation)
Russian Jews